The men's 400 metres hurdles event at the 1994 Commonwealth Games was held on 25 and 26 August at the Centennial Stadium in Victoria, British Columbia.

Medalists

Results

Heats

Final

References

400
1994